Aqa Jari (also Romanized as Āqā Jarī; also known as Agach Ayry and Aga Jari) is a village in Sojas Rud Rural District, Sojas Rud District, Khodabandeh County, Zanjan Province, Iran. At the 2006 census, its population was 536, in 108 families.

References 

Populated places in Khodabandeh County